The Other Boleyn Girl is a 2008 historical romantic drama film directed by Justin Chadwick. The screenplay by Peter Morgan was adapted from Philippa Gregory’s 2001 novel of the same name. It is a fictionalised account of the lives of 16th-century aristocrats Mary Boleyn, one-time mistress of King Henry VIII, and her sister, Anne, who became the monarch's ill-fated second wife, though the film does not represent history accurately.

Production studio BBC Films also owns the rights to adapt the 2006 sequel novel, The Boleyn Inheritance, which tells the story of Anne of Cleves, Catherine Howard and Jane Parker.

Plot 
King Henry VIII's marriage to Catherine of Aragon has failed to produced a living male heir. Their sole surviving child is Princess Mary. Meanwhile, Mary Boleyn marries William Carey, the son of a minor nobleman. Mary's uncle, Thomas Howard, Duke of Norfolk and her father, Thomas Boleyn plot to install Mary's older sister, Anne, as the king's mistress, hoping she will bear him a son and improve the family's wealth and status. Thomas's wife, Lady Elizabeth disapproves, but Anne accepts the task after Norfolk promises that being the king's mistress will lead to marriage with a high-ranking nobleman.

While visiting the Boleyn estate, King Henry is injured in a hunting accident indirectly caused by Anne's recklessness. Henry becomes smitten with Mary, who tends his wounds. The king invites Mary, her husband, and the Boleyn family to court. They accept, knowing what is expected. Mary and Anne become ladies-in-waiting to the aging Queen Catherine, while William Carey is sent abroad on an assignment. Mary begins a passionate affair with the king and finds herself falling in love with him. Anne secretly marries Henry Percy, a nobleman who was already betrothed to Lady Mary Talbot. Anne reveals the marriage to her brother, George Boleyn, who informs Mary. Knowing that any marriage among the nobility must be approved by the king, Mary alerts her father and uncle, who forcibly annul the union, keeping its existence secret. Anne is then sent away to the French court.

Mary becomes pregnant with Henry's child. The king rewards the Boleyn family by giving them new titles and estates, finer living quarters, their debts paid, and George being betrothed to Jane Parker, whom George detests. When Mary experiences complications in her pregnancy, she is confined to bed until her child is born, Norfolk recalls Anne to England and tasks her with distracting Henry from seeking another mistress. Resentful that the king initially preferred Mary, a revenge-driven Anne beguiles Henry. Thomas and Norfolk are thrilled when Mary gives birth to a son. Anne, however, informs Henry that the baby boy is illegitimate, therefore, he will not inherit the throne. This leads Henry to rejecting Mary and thus does not recognize her child as his own son. 

Anne refuses Henry's advances unless he no longer beds his wife and stop speaking to Mary. This infuriates Norfolk until Anne reveals her intent to become queen and bear the king a legitimate son. A heartbroken Mary and her child are exiled to the countryside. Mary is then widowed after her husband dies from illness.

Anne begins a campaign by pressuring Henry in breaking from the Catholic Church when the Pope refuses to annul his marriage to Queen Catherine. However, Henry learns some rumors of Anne's previous consummation to Henry Percy. Mary is brought back to court where Henry demands answers about the rumors. Mary assures him that the rumors are false and she decides to stay at Anne's urging. 

Henry declares himself Supreme Head of the Church of England, orders Cardinal Thomas Wolsey to annul his marriage, and banishes Queen Catherine from court. When Anne refuses to consummate their relationship until they are married, Henry, overcome with rage and lust, rapes her. While deeply traumatized by the assault, a now-pregnant Anne marries Henry and becomes the new Queen of England. 

Despite the birth of a healthy daughter, Elizabeth, Henry is disappointed that Anne failed to produce a male heir and begins to see Jane Seymour in secret. As queen, Anne is greatly hated by the public, who denounce her as a witch and she begins to have bouts of paranoia as her marriage to Henry starts to crumble. 

After miscarrying a son, Anne fears for her life and desperately begs George to impregnate her. He initially agrees, wanting to save Anne and their entire family, but is unable to go through with it. Unbeknownst to them, George's neglected wife, Jane, is spying on Anne for Norfolk and reports her suspicions to both him and the king. Anne and George are arrested on charges of incest, adultery and treason. Despite lacking physical evidence, the court, with Norfolk in attendance find both guilty and sentence them to death. Lady Elizabeth becomes distraught over the news and denounces her husband and brother, vowing to never forgive them for what their greed has done to her children. Mary rushes back to London but arrives too late to save George, who is beheaded. Mary begs King Henry for Anne's life and believes her sister will be spared as he says he wishes not to hurt Mary any further. The two sisters truly reconcile, and Anne asks Mary to look after Elizabeth if anything should happen to her.

As Anne gives her final speech, a message from Henry is delivered to Mary. He urges her not to return to court and relieves that Anne will be executed as arranged. After Anne's execution, Mary leaves with the toddler Elizabeth, taking her to her home in the country. 

A textual epilogue reveals that Thomas Boleyn died two years after Anne and George's executions, while Norfolk was imprisoned and the next three generations of the Howard family were executed for treason; Mary (later widowed) married William Stafford and lived out her days away from court with her children and her niece; Elizabeth went on to rule England for over forty years as queen.

Cast 
 Natalie Portman as Anne Boleyn. Portman was attracted to the role because it was a character that she "hadn’t played before", and describes Anne as "strong, yet she can be vulnerable and she's ambitious and calculating and will step on people but also feels remorse for it". One month before filming began, Portman started taking daily classes to master the English accent under dialect coach Jill McCulloch, who also stayed on set throughout the filming. This was her second film to use her English accent after V for Vendetta. Natalie Portman wore hair extensions for the long hair because her hair was short at the time after shaving her head for V for Vendetta.
 Scarlett Johansson as Mary Boleyn.
 Eric Bana as Henry VIII of England. Bana commented that he was surprised upon being offered the role, and describes the character of Henry as "a man who was somewhat juvenile and driven by passion and greed", and that he interpreted the character as "this man who was involved in an incredibly intricate, complicated situation, largely through his own doing". In preparation for the role, Bana relied mostly on the script to come up with his own version of the character, and he "deliberately stayed away" from other portrayals of Henry in films because he found it "too confusing and restricting".
 Jim Sturgess as George Boleyn, Viscount Rochford. Though the three siblings are all very tight-knit, George and Anne are closest. George supports and loves Anne for her rebellious and unconventional attitude. He is forced to marry Jane Parker. George is often viewed as the most vulnerable and probably the kindest of the siblings.
 Kristin Scott Thomas as Elizabeth Boleyn, Countess of Wiltshire and Ormond
 Mark Rylance as Thomas Boleyn, Earl of Wiltshire and Ormond
 David Morrissey as Thomas Howard, Duke of Norfolk
 Benedict Cumberbatch as William Carey
 Oliver Coleman as Henry Percy, Earl of Northumberland
 Ana Torrent as Catherine of Aragon
 Eddie Redmayne as William Stafford
 Juno Temple as Jane Parker
 Iain Mitchell as Thomas Cromwell
 Corinne Galloway as Jane Seymour
 Constance Stride as young Mary Tudor
 Maisie Smith as young Elizabeth Tudor
 Alfie Allen as the King's Messenger
 Andrew Garfield as Francis Weston

Production 
Much of the filming took place in Kent, England, though Hever Castle was not used, despite being the original household of Thomas Boleyn and family from 1505 to 1539. The Baron's Hall at Penshurst Place featured, as did Dover Castle, which stood in for the Tower of London in the film, and Knole House in Sevenoaks was used in several scenes. The home of the Boleyns was represented by Great Chalfield Manor in Wiltshire, and other scenes were filmed at locations in Derbyshire, including Cave Dale, Haddon Hall, Dovedale and North Lees Hall near Hathersage.

Dover Castle was transformed into the Tower of London for the execution scenes of George and Anne Boleyn. Knole House was the setting for many of the film's London night scenes and the inner courtyard doubles for the entrance of Whitehall Palace where the grand arrivals and departures were staged. The Tudor Gardens and Baron's Hall at Penshurst Place were transformed into the interiors of Whitehall Palace, including the scenes of Henry's extravagant feast.

Historical accuracy 

Historian Alex von Tunzelmann criticised The Other Boleyn Girl for its portrayal of the Boleyn family and Henry VIII, citing factual errors. She stated, "In real life, by the time Mary Boleyn started her affair with Henry, she had already enjoyed a passionate liaison with his great rival, King François I of France. Rather ungallantly, François called her 'my hackney', explaining that she was fun to ride. Chucked out of France by his irritated wife, Mary sashayed back to England and casually notched up her second kingly conquest. The film's portrayal of this Boleyn girl as a shy, blushing damsel could hardly be further from the truth." She further criticised the depiction of Anne as a "manipulative vixen" and Henry as "nothing more than a gullible sex addict in wacky shoulder pads". The film presents other historical inaccuracies, such as the statement by a character that, through marrying Henry Percy, Anne Boleyn would become Duchess of Northumberland, a title that was only created in the reign of Henry's son, Edward VI. Also, it places Anne's time in the French court after her involvement with Percy, something that occurred before the affair. On top of that, Anne was portrayed inaccurately  as the older sister in the movie, in real life she was Mary's younger sister.
In the film, Thomas Boleyn stated Anne was in France for a couple months. In real life Anne was in France for seven years.

Release

Theatrical 
The film was first released in theatres on February 29, 2008, though its world premiere was held at the 58th Berlin International Film Festival held on February 7–17, 2008. The film earned $9,442,224 in the United Kingdom, and $26,814,957 in the United States and Canada. The combined worldwide gross of the film was $75,598,644, more than double the film's $35 million budget.

Home media 
The film was released in Blu-ray and DVD formats on June 10, 2008. Extras on both editions include an audio commentary with director Justin Chadwick, deleted and extended scenes, character profiles, and featurettes. The Blu-ray version includes BD-Live capability and an additional picture-in-picture track with character descriptions, notes on the original story, and passages from the original book.

Soundtrack

Critical reception 
The film received mixed reviews. Rotten Tomatoes reported an approval rating of 43%, based on 148 reviews, with a weighted average of 5.30/10. The site's general consensus is: "Though it features some extravagant and entertaining moments, The Other Boleyn Girl feels more like a soap opera than historical drama." Metacritic reported the film had an average score of 50 out of 100, based on 34 reviews.

Manohla Dargis of The New York Times called the film "more slog than romp" and an "oddly plotted and frantically paced pastiche." She added, "The film is both underwritten and overedited. Many of the scenes seem to have been whittled down to the nub, which at times turns it into a succession of wordless gestures and poses. Given the generally risible dialogue, this isn’t a bad thing."

Mick LaSalle of the San Francisco Chronicle said, "This in an enjoyable movie with an entertaining angle on a hard-to-resist period of history ... Portman's performance, which shows a range and depth unlike anything she's done before, is the No. 1 element that tips The Other Boleyn Girl in the direction of a recommendation ... [She] won't get the credit she deserves for this, simply because the movie isn't substantial enough to warrant proper attention."

Peter Travers of Rolling Stone stated, "The film moves in frustrating herks and jerks. What works is the combustible teaming of Natalie Portman and Scarlett Johansson, who give the Boleyn hotties a tough core of intelligence and wit, swinging the film's sixteenth-century protofeminist issues handily into this one."

Peter Bradshaw of The Guardian awarded the film three out of five stars, describing it as a "flashy, silly, undeniably entertaining Tudor romp" and adding, "It is absurd yet enjoyable, and playing fast and loose with English history is a refreshing alternative to slow and tight solemnity; the effect is genial, even mildly subversive ... It is ridiculous, but imagined with humour and gusto: a very diverting gallop through the heritage landscape."

Sukhdev Sandhu of The Telegraph said, "This is a film for people who prefer their costume dramas to gallop along at a merry old pace rather than get bogged down in historical detail ... Mining relatively familiar material here, and dramatising highly dubious scenarios, [Peter Morgan] is unable to make the set-pieces seem revelatory or tart ... In the end, The Other Boleyn Girl is more anodyne than it has any right to be. It can't decide whether to be serious or comic. It promises an erotic charge that it never carries off, inducing dismissive laughs from the audience for its soft-focus love scenes soundtracked by swooning violins. It is tasteful, but unappetising."

See also 
 The Other Boleyn Girl (2003 film)
 Anne Boleyn in popular culture

References

External links 

 
 
 
 
 
 

2008 biographical drama films
2000s historical drama films
2000s historical romance films
2008 romantic drama films
2008 directorial debut films
2008 films
American biographical drama films
American historical drama films
American historical romance films
American romantic drama films
BBC Film films
Biographical films about English royalty
British biographical drama films
British historical drama films
British historical romance films
British romantic drama films
Columbia Pictures films
Cultural depictions of Anne Boleyn
Cultural depictions of Catherine of Aragon
Cultural depictions of Elizabeth I
Films about Henry VIII
Films based on British novels
Films produced by Alison Owen
Films scored by Paul Cantelon
Films set in London
Films shot at Elstree Film Studios
Films shot at Pinewood Studios
Films shot in Berkshire
Films shot in Cambridgeshire
Films shot in Cornwall
Films shot in Derbyshire
Films shot in East Sussex
Films shot in Gloucestershire
Films shot in Kent
Films shot in Somerset
Films shot in Wiltshire
Films with screenplays by Peter Morgan
Focus Features films
Universal Pictures films
Incest in film
Mary Boleyn
Relativity Media films
Romance films based on actual events
Films about sisters
Films directed by Justin Chadwick
2000s English-language films
2000s American films
2000s British films